Kung Tsui-chang (born 1 July 1975) is the Sacrificial Official to Confucius in the Republic of China (Taiwan).

Kung is the 79th-generation descendant of Confucius in the main line of descent, making him the titular head of the Kong family. Kung succeeded his grandfather Kung Te-cheng to the post of Sacrificial Official to Confucius in 2009 following the latter's death a year earlier and was at the same time appointed Senior Advisor by President Ma Ying-jeou.

The Tsui (垂) character in his name, is the generation name for 79th-generation descendants of Confucius. His children all have the character 佑 Yu in their names, it being the generation name given to 80th-generation descendants of Confucius.

His father Kung Wei-yi predeceased his grandfather Kung Te-cheng, and his mother is Kung Wei-yi's wife, Yu Yue-jie (于曰潔). Kung Tsui-chang and his wife, Wu Shuoyin (吳碩茵) have a son Kung Yu-jen (孔佑仁), born 1 January 2006 in Taipei, and a daughter, Kung Yu-xin (孔佑心).

Ancestry

References

 China Post article from 2007
 China Post from 2009

1975 births
Living people
Senior Advisors to President Ma Ying-jeou
Businesspeople from Taipei
Chinese Confucianists
Descendants of Confucius